Saint-Aubin-sur-Scie (literally Saint-Aubin on Scie) is a commune in the Seine-Maritime department in the Normandy region in northern France.

Geography

Heraldry

Population

Places of interest
 The seventeenth-century chateau of Miromesnil.
 A seventeenth-century chapel.
 The church of St. Aubin, dating from the thirteenth century.
 The chapel of St. Antoine, dating from the sixteenth century.

See also
Communes of the Seine-Maritime department

References

External links

 Official commune website 

Communes of Seine-Maritime